The Moulouya River (Berber: iɣẓer en Melwect) is a 520 km-long river in Morocco. Its sources are located in the Ayashi mountain in the Middle Atlas. It empties into the Mediterranean Sea near Saïdia, in northeast Morocco.

Water level in the river often fluctuates. The river is used for irrigation and is dammed by the Hassan II and Mohamed V Dams.

History

Before French colonisation, the Moulouya River was considered as the border between Ottoman Algeria and the dynasties that controlled Morocco. A battle between the Algerians and the Alawites took place in 1692 at the ford of this river.

The Romans called this river Malva. In medieval British pseudo-history, it was mentioned as a location along the route supposedly travelled by the ancestors of the Scotti, and by Brutus of Troy. The Moulouya River formed the eastern border of the kingdom of Mauretania since King Bocchus I, and more recently of the Rif Republic in the 1920s, a small part of Morocco containing important cities like Saïdia and Oujda lying to the east, between the Moulouya and the border with Algeria. Until 1956 the river also formed the eastern border of the Spanish Protectorate of Morocco.

Ecology
In August 2011 fish were killed by pollutants in the Moulouya River and local residents feared for their crops and livestock.

References

External links

Rivers of Morocco
Ramsar sites in Morocco